The 1995 Miami Hooters season was the fourth and final season for the Miami Hooters before their rebrand as the Florida Bobcats. They finished the 1995 Arena Football League season 1–11 and were the only team in the Southern Division to not make the playoffs.

Regular season

Schedule

Standings

Awards

References

Florida Bobcats seasons
1995 Arena Football League season
Miami Hooters Season, 1995